Hugh Brannum (January 5, 1910 – April 19, 1987) was an American vocalist, arranger, composer, and actor known for his role as Mr. Green Jeans on the children's television show Captain Kangaroo. During his days with Fred Waring and his Pennsylvanians, Brannum used his childhood nickname "Lumpy".

Early years

Brannum was born in Sandwich, Illinois, in 1910 to a Methodist minister. He attended Maine Township High School in suburban Chicago, where he played sousaphone in the school's marching band, later learning the bass violin.

Brannum went to college at University of Redlands, where he became interested in jazz; after graduation in 1931, he played bass in various bands.

Career

During World War II, Brannum enlisted in the US Marine Corps and joined a Marine band led by Bob Crosby. After the war, he joined the Four Squires, and later moved to Fred Waring and His Pennsylvanians; Waring's group had a regular radio show on NBC, where Brannum met fellow Marine Bob Keeshan, who was working at the network, and who later hired Brannum for Captain Kangaroo.

Before his time on Captain Kangaroo, Brannum hosted a local children's TV series called Uncle Lumpy's Cabin, seen weekday afternoons at 5 on WJZ-TV, (now WABC-TV) in New York City during the 1951 season.

Mr. Green Jeans earned his moniker from his distinctive apparel, a pair of farmer's overalls (later, jeans and a denim jacket) in his signature green (although, since the show was broadcast in black-and-white for much of its run, this was lost on viewers). He was a talented and inquisitive handyman who provided assistance at the Treasure House. He frequently visited the Captain with the latest addition to his menagerie of zoo animals.

Aside from Mr. Green Jeans, Brannum played a number of characters on Captain Kangaroo from 1955 to 1984, including the Professor, Greeno the Clown, the New Old Folk Singer, and Mr. Bainter the Painter. His role as Mr. Green Jeans was partly based on stories about a farm kid named "Little Orley" that he told with the Fred Waring orchestra, on the radio and on 78-rpm records under the pseudonym "Uncle Lumpy". According to Bob Keeshan, Mr. Green Jeans was an extension of Brannum's real personality. During one episode of Captain Kangaroo, a lion cub bit Brannum's finger and drew blood. Brannum stuck his bleeding hand into his pocket and never broke character for the remainder of the episode.

Death
Brannum died of cancer in East Stroudsburg, Pennsylvania, in 1987.

In popular culture
A long-running but incorrect rumor claims Brannum was the father of musician Frank Zappa, apparently because of a Zappa composition titled "Son of Mr. Green Genes" on his 1969 album, Hot Rats.
Along with Bob Keeshan, he is mentioned in the Jim Lehrer novel The Phony Marine.

Discography
Soloist and/or composer and/or arranger, as Hugh (Lumpy) Brannum, on the following Fred Waring recordings:

Get Well
Little Orley and His Coonskin Cap
Little Orley and His Fly-Frog-Fish Orchestra
Little Orley and the Cricket
Little Orley and the Happy Bird
Little Orley and the Haunted House
Little Orley and the Little Engine
Little Orley's Barn Dance
Little Orley's Big Concert
Little Orley–His Adventures as a Worm
Little Orley–His Adventures with Dr. Feather
Little Orley–His Adventures with the Cloud
Little Orley–His Adventures with the Parade
Little Rhumba Numba, The
Orley and the Bubble Gum
Orley and the Bull Fiddle
Orley and the Ivy
Orley and the Moon
Orley and the Pancake

References

External links
 
 "Son of Mr. Greenjeans?"—Snopes
 Hugh Brannum biography on TVacres.com
 Hugh Brannum biography  on LittleOrley.com
 
 New York Times obituary

 

1910 births
1987 deaths
20th-century American male actors
Actors from Park Ridge, Illinois
American male television actors
Deaths from cancer in Pennsylvania
People from Sandwich, Illinois
United States Marines
United States Marine Corps personnel of World War II